George William Finch-Hatton, 10th Earl of Winchilsea, 5th Earl of Nottingham (19 May 1791 – 8 January 1858) was an English politician known for duelling with the then Prime Minister, Arthur Wellesley, 1st Duke of Wellington.

Early life
Hatton, born at Kirby Hall, Northamptonshire, on 19 May 1791, was grandson of Edward Finch-Hatton, and son of George Finch-Hatton (1747–1823) of Eastwell Park, near Ashford, Kent, M.P. for Rochester 1772–84, by his wife whom he married in 1785, Lady Elizabeth Murray, eldest daughter of David Murray, 2nd Earl of Mansfield. She died on 1 June 1825.

George William, the elder son, was educated at Westminster School and Christ's College, Cambridge, where he proceeded B.A. in 1812. On 13 October 1809 he became a captain in the Ashford regiment of Kentish local militia, on 14 December 1819 commenced acting as a lieutenant of the Northamptonshire regiment of yeomanry, and on 7 September 1820 was named a deputy-lieutenant for the county of Kent. His cousin, George Finch, 9th Earl of Winchilsea and fourth earl of Nottingham, having died on 2 August 1826, succeeded to these peerages.

House of Lords
He presided at a very large and influential meeting held on Penenden Heath, Kent, on 10 October 1828, when strongly worded resolutions in favour of Protestant principles were carried. In his place in the House of Lords, he violently opposed almost every liberal measure which was brought forward. He was particularly noted as being almost the only English nobleman who was willing to identify himself with the Orange party in Ireland, and he was accustomed to denouncing in frantic terms Daniel O'Connell and the system of education carried out in St Patrick's College, Maynooth.

Occasionally he took the chair at May meetings at Exeter Hall, but his intemperate language prevented him from becoming a leader in evangelical politics. The Catholic Relief Bill of 1829 encountered his most vehement hostility, and ultimately led to a duel with the Duke of Wellington. Lord Winchilsea, in a letter to the secretary of King's College London, wrote that the duke, "under the cloak of some coloured show of zeal for the Protestant religion, carried on an insidious design for the infringement of our liberties and the introduction of popery into every department of the state". The duke replied with a challenge. The meeting took place in Battersea Fields on 21 March 1829, the duke being attended by Sir Henry Hardinge, and his opponent by Edward Boscawen, 4th Viscount Falmouth. The duke fired and missed; he claimed he did so on purpose. However, the duke was known as a poor shot and accounts differ as to whether he purposefully missed. Winchilsea kept his arm by his side at the command to "fire" then quite deliberately raised his arm in the air and fired. He then apologised for the language of his letter. It is almost certain that Winchilsea and Falmouth had agreed on their course of action, as the letter of apology was already prepared.

He was a very frequent speaker in the Lords, and strenuously opposed the Reform Bill and other Whig measures. He was gazetted lieutenant-colonel commandant of the East Kent Yeomanry on 20 December 1830, named a deputy-lieutenant for the county of Lincoln on 26 September 1831, and created a D.C.L. at Oxford on 10 June 1834.

Personal life
Winchilsea was married three times:
 Georgiana Charlotte. on 26 July 1814, eldest daughter of James Graham, 3rd Duke of Montrose, she died at Haverholme Priory on 13 February 1835. Together they had:
 George Finch-Hatton, 11th Earl of Winchilsea (1815–1887)
 Lady Caroline Finch-Hatton (c1817–1888)
 Emily Georgiana, on 15 February 1837, second daughter of Sir Charles Bagot, G.C.B., she died at Haverholme Priory on 10 July 1848
 Fanny Margaretta, on 17 October 1849, eldest daughter of Edward Royd Rice of Dane Court, Kent and his wife Elizabeth Austen. She died on 26 April 1909. She is a great-niece of Jane Austen through Elizabeth Austen, daughter of Edward Austen Knight. Together they had:
 Lady Evelyn Georgiana Finch-Hatton (–1932)
 Murray Finch-Hatton, 12th Earl of Winchilsea (1851–1898)
 Henry Finch-Hatton, 13th Earl of Winchilsea (1852–1927)
 Harold Finch-Hatton (1856–1904)

He died at Haverholme Priory, near Sleaford, Lincolnshire, 8 January 1858.

Influence
He was the writer of a pamphlet entitled Earl of Winchilsea's Letter to the "Times", calling upon the Protestants of Great Britain to unite heart and soul in addressing the Throne for a Dissolution of Parliament, 1851.

He was responsible for the phrase Kentish Fire meaning prolonged derisive cheering.

References

Attribution

1791 births
1858 deaths
People educated at Westminster School, London
Alumni of Christ's College, Cambridge
People from North Northamptonshire
Conservative Party (UK) hereditary peers
10
705
British duellists
British Militia officers
Royal East Kent Yeomanry officers
People associated with King's College London
Deputy Lieutenants of Lincolnshire
George
Ultra-Tory peers